Dylan Osetkowski (born August 8, 1996) is an American-German professional basketball player who is currently playing for Unicaja of the Spanish Liga ACB. He played college basketball for the Texas Longhorns and the Tulane Green Wave.

High school career
Osetkowski played basketball for JSerra Catholic High School in San Juan Capistrano, California. As a senior, he averaged 14.8 points and 9.9 rebounds per game and was a first-team All-Trinity League selection. He led his team to the CIF Southern Section Division 4AA championship, scoring 16 points in the title game. Osetkowski received strong interest from only two NCAA Division I programs out of high school, Tulane and UC Irvine. He committed to Tulane on July 12, 2014.

College career
As a freshman for Tulane, Osetkowski averaged 6.3 points and 4.8 rebounds per game. He was placed in a more important role in his sophomore season, averaging 11.3 points and 8.3 rebounds per game and registering 11 double-doubles. After the season, Osetkowski transferred to Texas and sat out the next season due to National Collegiate Athletic Association transfer rules. In his junior season, he averaged a team-high 13.4 points and 7.2 rebounds per game and was an honorable mention All-Big 12 Conference selection. As a senior, Osetkowski averaged 11.1 points, 7.2 rebounds and 1.4 steals per game. He led Texas to the National Invitational Tournament title and was named most valuable player of the competition. In the first round of the NIT, Osetkowski scored a career-high 26 points in a 79-73 win over South Dakota State.

Professional career
Osetkowski played for the Cleveland Cavaliers at 2019 NBA Summer League. He signed his first professional contract with ratiopharm Ulm of the Basketball Bundesliga (BBL) and was immediately loaned to BG Göttingen, with whom he averaged 12.6 points and 6.2 rebounds per game in the BBL.

On May 22, 2020, Osetkowski returned to ratiopharm Ulm and began his two-year contract with the club. On November 12, he was named EuroCup player of the week after contributing 32 points and seven rebounds in a victory over Pallacanestro Brescia. He finished the season averaging 17.9 points, 5.3 rebounds, 2.8 assists and 1.0 steals (21.8 point PIR) in the EuroCup, and 13.2 points, 5.6 rebounds, 2.5 assists and 1.2 steals in the BBL.

On July 14, 2021, Osetkowski inked a two-year deal with current French champs and Euroleague team ASVEL Basket.

On July 2, 2022, Osetkowski signed with Unicaja of the Spanish Liga ACB.

Personal life
Osetkowski's older brother, Cory, played college basketball for Columbia and set the program record for career games played. In May 2020, Osetkowski announced that he received German citizenship.

References

External links
Eurobasket.com Profile
Eurocupbasketball.com Profile
RealGM.com profile
Texas Longhorns bio
Tulane Green Wave bio

Living people
1996 births
American men's basketball players
American expatriate basketball people in France
American expatriate basketball people in Germany
American expatriate basketball people in Spain
American people of Polish descent
ASVEL Basket players
Baloncesto Málaga players
Basketball players from San Diego
BG Göttingen players
Centers (basketball)
German men's basketball players
Liga ACB players
Power forwards (basketball)
Ratiopharm Ulm players
Texas Longhorns men's basketball players
Tulane Green Wave men's basketball players